Chinese headwear have a long history. According to some scholars, China used to be called "the Kingdom of Headwear" by people due to its variety of colourful and artistic style of hair ornament. Chinese people also wore Chinese hairpins. Chinese women, in particular, like to use flowers (either natural or artificial) as hair decorations for centuries; they also wore shubi in their hair and sometimes wore the honggaitou on their weddings.

Types of Headwear for males

Types of headwear for females

See also 

 Chinese hairpin
 Hanfu 
 Honggaitou 
 List of Hanfu
Shubi - Chinese comb
Tian-tsui

References 

Hanfu
Chinese headgear